A number of steamships have been named Malabar

, a P & O steamship launched 1858; wrecked at Point de Galle 1860

, a steamship that wrecked at Sydney, Australia on 2 April 1931. All 108 passengers and crew survived. The town of Malabar within Randwick City Council is named after the ship.

Ship names